Methodist Tabernacle may refer to:

Tabernacle (Methodist), the central part of a camp meeting
Methodist Tabernacle (Columbus, Georgia), listed on the National Register of Historic Places in Muscogee County, Georgia
Methodist Tabernacle (Mathews, Virginia), listed on the National Register of Historic Places in Mathews County, Virginia